is a Japanese football player. He plays for MIO Biwako Shiga.

Playing career
Yutaro Masuda played for MIO Biwako Shiga from 2007 to 2012. In 2013, he moved to SC Sagamihara. In 2015, he back to MIO Biwako Shiga.

References

External links

1985 births
Living people
Osaka University of Commerce alumni
Association football people from Osaka Prefecture
Japanese footballers
J3 League players
Japan Football League players
MIO Biwako Shiga players
SC Sagamihara players
Association football defenders